The 59th Berlin International Film Festival was held from 5 February to 15 February 2009. The opening film of the festival was Tom Tykwer’s The International, screened out of competition. Costa-Gavras's immigrant drama Eden Is West served as the closing night film at the festival. The festival's jury president was actress Tilda Swinton of the United Kingdom.

The Golden Bear was awarded to Peruvian film La Teta Asustada directed by Claudia Llosa. The retrospective dedicated to the Golden Age of 70mm filmmaking from 1955 to 1970, titled 70 mm – Bigger than Life was shown at the festival.

Admission for the festival was reported to be among the highest in years, and it also set a record for ticket sales, with some 270,000 tickets sold by the halfway mark, compared to 240,000 sold for the entire run of the festival the previous year. The final ticket tally was the largest in the festival’s 59-year history.

Jury 

The following people were announced as being on the jury for the festival:

International jury
 Tilda Swinton, actress (United Kingdom) - Jury President
 Isabel Coixet, director and screenwriter (Spain)
 Gaston Kaboré, director (Burkina Faso)
 Henning Mankell, writer (Sweden)
 Christoph Schlingensief, playwright and director (Germany)
 Wayne Wang, director, screenwriter and producer (Hong Kong)
 Alice Waters (United States)

Best First Feature Award Jury
 Hannah Herzsprung, actress (Germany)
 In-Ah Lee, producer (Germany)
 Rafi Pitts, director (Iran)

International Short Film Jury
 Khavn De La Cruz, director, screenwriter and producer (Philippines)
 Arta Dobroshi, actress (Kosovo)
 Lars Henrik Gass, director of the International Short Film Festival Oberhausen (Germany)

In competition 
The following films were selected in competition for the Golden Bear and Silver Bear awards:

Out of competition screening 
The following films were selected for the out of competition screening at the festival:

Key
{| class="wikitable" width="550" colspan="1"
| style="background:#FFDEAD;" align="center"| †
|Winner of the main award for best film in its section
|-
| colspan="2"| The opening and closing films are screened during the opening and closing ceremonies respectively.
|}

Awards

The following prizes were awarded by the Jury:

Golden Bear
The Golden Bear went to La teta asustada by Claudia Llosa.

Silver Bears 
Jury Grand Prix (Grand Prize of the Jury): Adrián Biniez for Gigante and Maren Ade for Alle Anderen
Best Director: Asghar Farhadi for Darbereye Elly
Best Actor: Sotigui Kouyaté for London River
Best Actress: Birgit Minichmayr for Alle Anderen
Best Script: Oren Moverman and Alessandro Camon for The Messenger
Outstanding Artistic Contribution (sound design): György Kovács, Gábor ifj. Erdélyi and Tamás Székely. for Katalin Varga
Alfred Bauer Prize: Andrzej Wajda for Tatarak and Adrián Biniez for Gigante
FIPRESCI Award: Claudia Llosa for La teta asustada

References

External links 

Yearbook 2009 at berlinale.de
59th Berlin International Film Festival 2009

59
2009 in Berlin
Berlin International Film Festival
Berlin International Film Festival
2009 in German cinema